Martín Ibarreche Vásquez is a Mexican former footballer.

Career
He started his career in the Primera Division in 1960 with newly formed Club de Fútbol Torreón where he played two years and later moved to play with América where he played seven years; at the latter he won one league title in the 1965–1966 tournament. In 1969, he had a short stay with club Toluca. In 1970, he joined the recently promoted Puebla F.C., where he played for seven years where he finished his career in 1977.

Ibarreche's grandfather, Lázaro, was also a professional footballer who played for clubs in Mexico.

Achievements
'''Mexican Primera División: 1964-1965

References

External links

 

1943 births
Living people
Footballers from Coahuila
Mexican footballers
Club América footballers
Deportivo Toluca F.C. players
Club Puebla players
Mexican people of Spanish descent
Sportspeople from Torreón
Santos Laguna managers
Association football defenders
Mexican people of Basque descent
Liga MX players
Mexican football managers
20th-century Mexican people